Julie Kathryn Howard (born October 23, 1976), later known by her married name Julie Johnson, is a former international butterfly and backstroke swimmer from Canada, who competed at two consecutive Summer Olympics.

At the 1992 Summer Olympics in Barcelona, Spain, she was eliminated in the qualifying heats of the 100-metre butterfly and 100-metre backstroke.  Four years later at the 1996 Summer Olympics in Atlanta, United States, Howard's best finish was the fifth place with the Canadian relay team in the 4×100-metre medley, alongside Sarah Evanetz, Guylaine Cloutier and Shannon Shakespeare.  In 1995 she won the silver medal in the 4×100-metre medley relay at the 1995 FINA Short Course World Championships, teaming up with Jessica Amey, Lisa Flood and Shannon Shakespeare.

She now teaches STRIDE and AIG in W.H. Robinson elementary school, and French at Markham District High School.

References
 
 
 

1976 births
Living people
Canadian female backstroke swimmers
Canadian female butterfly swimmers
Medalists at the FINA World Swimming Championships (25 m)
Olympic swimmers of Canada
Sportspeople from Brantford
Swimmers at the 1992 Summer Olympics
Swimmers at the 1996 Summer Olympics
20th-century Canadian women